Jerry and Pleasant View are two adjacent unincorporated communities in Tyrrell County, North Carolina, United States; Jerry lies southeast of Pleasant View.  Both communities lie at an elevation of 3 feet (1 m).  Jerry is located at  (35.8821078, -76.2268719), while Pleasant View is located at  (35.8893301, -76.2327058).

References

Unincorporated communities in Tyrrell County, North Carolina
Unincorporated communities in North Carolina